Kemp may refer to:

Places
 Kemp, Illinois
 Kemp, Ohio
 Kemp, Oklahoma
 Kemp, Texas
 Kemp Land and Kemp Coast, Antarctica
 Kemp Town, a 19th-century estate in East Sussex, England
 Kemps Corner, place in India

People 
 Kemp (surname)
 Kemp Hannon, American politician
 Te Keepa Te Rangihiwinui (c. 1820–98), also known as Major Kemp, Māori military leader

Other uses
 "Kemp" (song), a song appearing on Home From Home by Millencolin
 Kemp (wool), a type of sheep's hair
 Kemp Technologies, a networking appliances company

See also
 
 Kem (disambiguation)